Eric Ralph Lingeman CBE (19 June 1898 – 4 January 1966) was a British diplomat. He was Ambassador to Afghanistan from 1951 to 1953, and Ambassador to Uruguay from 1953 to 1955.

He was appointed a CBE in 1947.

References

Ambassadors of the United Kingdom to Afghanistan
Ambassadors of the United Kingdom to Uruguay
1898 births
1966 deaths
Commanders of the Order of the British Empire
Place of birth missing
Place of death missing